The blue-billed curassow (Crax alberti) is a species of bird in the family Cracidae, the chachalacas, guans, and curassows. It is endemic to Colombia.

Taxonomy and systematics

The blue-billed curassow is monotypic. However, it formerly included what is now the yellow-knobbed curassow (Crax daubentoni) as a subspecies. The holotype of putative species C. annulata has been determined to be a female blue-billed curassow.

Description

It is the only curassow with a blue cere and wattle, the latter found only on the male. Males are mostly black with a white vent and tail tip. Females are also mostly black but their lower belly and vent are rufous. They have fine white barring on the wings and tail, and a rare "barred" morph also has barring on the breast and belly. Both sexes have an erectile crest, the male's black and the female's black and white.

Distribution and habitat

The blue-billed curassow is found only in northern Colombia. It has a highly fragmented range, with small populations between La Guajira and Magdalena Departments south to Antioquia and Boyacá Departments.

Behavior

Feeding

The blue-billed curassow mainly feeds on the ground. Its diet has not been extensively studied but it is known to include fruits, worms, and insects. It also takes in sand and small stones as digestive aids.

Breeding

The blue-billed curassow's breeding season spans from December to at least April. It is reported to be monogamous. It builds a large nest of sticks and dead leaves and conceals it in dense vine tangles. It typically places it between the understory and the subcanopy. The clutch size is two eggs.

Vocalization

Male blue-billed curassows "boom" from the ground, "a 4–5-syllable series of deep notes...repeated over and over, 'hmm...hmh...hmm...hmm...hmh'". Both sexes give an alarm call, a "soft, high-pitched whistle  'peh-weeeéoh' or 'pehoo'".

Status

The IUCN has assessed the blue-billed curassow as Critically Endangered. Its population is estimated to be fewer than 1,500 mature individuals and its population is fragmented and decreasing. Deforestation and hunting are the major threats. The ProAves El Paujil Bird Reserve in Santander Department was created in 2003 especially to protect one population. Captive breeding has been successful.

References

External links

BirdLife Species Factsheet.
"Blue-knobbed Curassow"-Stamps (for Colombia) with RangeMap
Blue-billed Curassow photo gallery VIREO
"Blue-knobbed Curassow" species write-up; Photo-High Res oiseaux

blue-billed curassow
blue-billed curassow
Endemic birds of Colombia
blue-billed curassow
blue-billed curassow
Taxonomy articles created by Polbot